Veijo Väinö Valvo Meri (31 December 1928 – 21 June 2015) was a Finnish writer. Much of his work focuses on war and its absurdity.  The work is anti-war and has dark humor.

Born in Viipuri (today Vyborg, Russia), Meri graduated from secondary school in Hämeenlinna, then studied history and became an independent writer.

His diverse body of work includes novels, short stories, poetry, and essays.

Translations into English
 Manila rope: A novel. (Translated from the Finnish by John McGahern and Annikki Laaksi.) 1967.
 Private Jokinen’s marriage leave. (Translated from the Finnish by J. R. Pitkin.) 1976.
 Beneath the Polar Star: Glimpses of Finnish History. (English translation by Philip Binham.) 1999.

References

External links

 Biography by Finnish Literature Society

1928 births
2015 deaths
Writers from Vyborg
Finnish male short story writers
Finnish short story writers
Finnish essayists
Finnish male poets
Finnish translators
Nordic Council Literature Prize winners
Recipients of the Eino Leino Prize
20th-century Finnish poets
20th-century Finnish novelists
20th-century translators
20th-century short story writers
20th-century essayists
20th-century male writers